Hipposideros tephrus is a species of bat in the family Hipposideridae. It is found in forest and savanna in Morocco, Yemen, and Senegal. It is assessed by the IUCN as least-concern.

References 

Mammals described in 1906
Taxa named by Ángel Cabrera
Bats of Africa
Bats of Asia
Hipposideros